The following article presents a summary of the 1989 football (soccer) season in Brazil, which was the 88th season of competitive football in the country.

Campeonato Brasileiro Série A

Second stage

As Vasco da Gama had a better season record than São Paulo, the club earned a bonus point to the final and the right to choose where the first leg of the final would be played.

Final

Vasco da Gama declared as the Campeonato Brasileiro champions after reaching 3 points.

Relegation
The three worst placed teams in the relegation stage, which are Atlético Paranaense, Guarani and Sport, were relegated to the following year's second level. Coritiba was also relegated, after being excluded from the competition in the first stage.

Campeonato Brasileiro Série B

Quarterfinals

|}

Semifinals

|}

Final

Bragantino declared as the Campeonato Brasileiro Série B champions by aggregate score of 3-1.

Promotion
The champion and the runner-up, which are Bragantino and São José, were promoted to the following year's first level.

Copa do Brasil

The Copa do Brasil final was played between Grêmio and Sport.

Grêmio declared as the cup champions by aggregate score of 1-0.

State championship champions

Youth competition champions

Other competition champions

Brazilian clubs in international competitions

Brazil national team
The following table lists all the games played by the Brazil national football team in official competitions and friendly matches during 1989.

(1)Chile abandoned the match at 1–0. After an investigation, FIFA awarded Brazil a 2–0 win.

Women's football

National team
The Brazil women's national football team did not play any matches in 1989.

Domestic competition champions

References

 Brazilian competitions at RSSSF
 1989 Brazil national team matches at RSSSF
 1986-1996 Brazil women's national team matches at RSSSF

 
Seasons in Brazilian football
Brazil